Gloria Jane Stroock is an American actress. She is best known for her supporting role in the television series McMillan & Wife as Maggie, the secretary of lead character Stewart McMillan.

Early years
Stroock is the daughter of James Stroock, president of Brooks Costume and Uniform Company, and his wife. She was the elder sister of Geraldine Brooks.

Career 
On television, Stroock portrayed Cornelia Otis Skinner in the CBS situation comedy The Girls (1950). She co-starred in "Person to Person", the November 7, 1950, episode of Armstrong Circle Theatre.

Stroock had supporting roles in films including The Competition and The Day of the Locust as well as guest roles in television series such as Archie Bunker's Place, Baretta, Martin Kane, Private Eye, and Operation Petticoat.

Stroock's roles on Broadway included Joan Massuber in Oh, Brother (1945), Meg in Little Women (1945), and Polly Dalton in Cayden (1949). She also appeared in Truckline Cafe (1946).

Personal life
On August 12, 1956, Stroock married Leonard B. Stern. They remained wed until his death in 2011; the couple had two children, Kate and Michael.

Filmography

References

External links
 
  Gloria Stroock's website

American film actresses
American television actresses
Living people
Actresses from New York City
20th-century American actresses
American stage actresses
21st-century American women
Year of birth missing (living people)